The men's 4×200 metre freestyle relay event at the 1988 Summer Olympics took place between 20–21 September at the Jamsil Indoor Swimming Pool in Seoul, South Korea.

Records
Prior to this competition, the existing world and Olympic records were as follows.

The following new world and Olympic records were set during this competition.

Results

Heats
Rule: The eight fastest teams advance to the final (Q).

Final

References

External links
 Official Report
 USA Swimming

Swimming at the 1988 Summer Olympics
4 × 200 metre freestyle relay
Men's events at the 1988 Summer Olympics